RST may refer to:

Businesses and organisations
 Renault Sport Technologies, a former name of the motorsport vehicle division of Renault
 Rhodesian Selection Trust, a former Northern Rhodesian mining company
 Rosetta Stone (company) (NYSE stock ticker symbol), a language education software company
 Royal Society of Tasmania, a Tasmanian scientific organisation

Places
 Rochester International Airport, Minnesota, US (by IATA code)
 Royal Shakespeare Theatre, Stratford-upon-Avon, England

Science and technology

Computing
reStructuredText (file extension .rst), a lightweight markup language
RST, the reset flag in the Transmission Control Protocol
 Intel Rapid Storage Technology, a computer storage technology
 Reverse semantic traceability, a software quality control method

Medicine and psychology
 Rapid strep test, for strep throat
 Reading span task, a memory span test
 Reinforcement sensitivity theory, a psychological theory

Other uses in science and technology
 R-S-T system (or RST code), a method of reporting radio signal quality 
 RST model, a model of general relativity
 Nancy Grace Roman Space Telescope, a NASA infrared satellite telescope
 Rhetorical structure theory, a linguistic theory of text organization

Other uses
 Registered Safe Technician, a basic safe-cracking qualification
 Retail sales tax
 Romance Standard Time or Central European Time

See also